Jonathan Sperber (born 26 December 1952) is an American academic and historian who is a professor emeritus at the University of Missouri and author of modern European History.

Early life and academic career 
Jonathan Sperber was born on 26 December 1952 in New York City, to Louis and Ruth Sperber. He attended the Abraham Lincoln High School in Brooklyn. Sperber was an undergraduate at Cornell University from 1969 to 1973 and went to graduate school at the University of Chicago. While there, he studied with historian Leonard Krieger. He received his Ph.D. from Chicago in 1980. He was an archivist at the Leo Baeck Institute in New York from 1979 to 1982, and, after a brief visiting professorship at Northwestern University from 1982 to1984, went to work at the University of Missouri in 1984, where he still resides. At Missouri, he was assistant professor (1984–87), associate professor (1987–92) and professor of history (1992–2003). He was appointed Curators’ Professor of History in 2003, and served as chair of the history department between 2005–2010. He is a member of the German Studies Association and the American Historical Association.

Author 
Sperber has written a number of books on the political, social and religious history of nineteenth-century Europe. His 2013 book Karl Marx: A Nineteenth-Century Life was critically well-reviewed, which the New York Times described as an "absorbing, meticulously researched biography" in its Editors Choice Book Review. The book was a 2014 Pulitzer Prize Finalist in Biography. The book was also named one of the Best Books of the Year by Publishers Weekly and Book Riot.

Personal life
Sperber is married to Nancy Lynn Katzman with one son, Adam Philip.

Awards and Fellowships
 German Academic Exchange Service Fellowship, 1976-78, 1986, 1999
 Herbert Baxter Adams Prize, American Historical Association for the best first book in European history by an American author for Popular Catholicism in Nineteenth-Century Germany, 1985
 Visiting Research Fellow, Alexander von Humboldt Stiftung at the University of Cologne, 1987-88
 John Simon Guggenheim Memorial Foundation Fellowship, 1988-89
 German Studies Association Prize for the best book on German history or politics, for Rhineland Radicals, 1993
 American Philosophical Society Fellow, 1994
 Alan Sharlin Memorial Prize of the Social Science History Association awarded for the best book in social science history for The Kaiser's Voters, 1998
 National Endowment for the Humanities Fellow for college and university teachers, 2001-02

Bibliography
 Popular Catholicism in Nineteenth-Century Germany (Princeton University Press, 1984)
 Rhineland Radicals: The Democratic Movement and the Revolution of 1848-1849 (Princeton University Press, 1992)
 The Kaiser's Voters: Electors and Elections in Imperial Germany (Cambridge University Press, 1997)
 Revolutionary Europe, 1780-1850 (Routledge, 2000)
 Europe in 1848: Revolution and Reform (Berghahn Books, 2001)
 Germany, 1800-1870 (Oxford University Press, 2004)
 Property and Civil Society in South-Western Germany 1820-1914 (Oxford University Press, 2005)
 The European Revolutions, 1848-1851 (New Approaches to European History) (Cambridge University Press, 2005)
 Europe 1850-1914: Progress, Participation and Apprehension (Routledge, 2008)
 Karl Marx: A Nineteenth-Century Life (Liveright, 2013)
 Bourgeois Europe, 1850-1914 2nd Ed. (Routledge, 2022)
 The Age of Interconnection: A Global History of the Second Half of the Twentieth Century (Oxford University Press, 2023)

References 

Living people
University of Chicago alumni
Cornell University alumni
1952 births
University of Missouri faculty
20th-century American male writers